Foot Levelers is a foot care, footwear, and whole body health company based in Roanoke, Virginia, and owned by Kent S. Greenawalt.

History 
Foot Levelers began in Iowa, in 1952, by Chiropractor Monte H. Greenawalt. Greenawalt earned his degree from Lincoln Chiropractic College and began to notice a pattern in patients with foot problems—his adjustments did not hold. Dr. Monte referred these patients to a podiatrist, but their problems persisted.

Monte began to experiment with orthotics, and through trial and error, developed a formula based on 16 unique measurements of the foot. Unlike off-the-shelf orthotics or even those made by podiatrists, Monte’s orthotic was designed to support all three arches of the foot, rather than just one. Through Greenawalt's orthotics invention, his patients began to show positive results and his adjustments held longer.

In Foot Levelers multi-decade history, they have served tens of thousands of doctors and millions of patients through their patented orthotic technology. They have offices in the U.S., Europe, and Australia and serve customers in over 80 countries.

Foot Levelers holds title sponsorship of "America's Toughest Road Marathon", the Blue Ridge Marathon, since 2012.

Research Studies 

 ACRM (Archives of Physical Medicine and Rehabilitation), "Shoe Orthotics for the Treatment of Chronic Low Back Pain: A Randomized Controlled Trial"

Sources

References 

Orthopedics
Footwear_accessories
Chiropractic
Podiatry